Ladies' Death and Derby Society (LDDS) is a women's flat-track roller derby league in Madison County, NY. Founded in 2012, the league had their first home bout in August 2013 and began their first full bouting season in 2014.

The league has one team, the TitleTown KnockOuts, that competes against B-level teams across the Northeast.

Roller derby leagues in New York (state)
Madison County, New York
Oneida, New York
2012 establishments in New York (state)
Roller derby leagues established in 2012